Mind & Language is a peer-reviewed academic journal published five times a year by Wiley-Blackwell. It covers research in the study of mind and language primarily from the fields of linguistics, philosophy, psychology, artificial intelligence, and cognitive anthropology. The editor-in-chief is Gregory Currie.

According to the Journal Citation Reports, the journal has a 2016 impact factor of 0.962.

References

External links 
 

Philosophy of mind journals
Cognitive science journals
Wiley-Blackwell academic journals
Publications established in 1986
English-language journals
5 times per year journals